Moon Sung-kil (born July 20, 1963) is a Korean former professional boxer who competed from 1987 to 1993. He is a world champion in two weight classes, having held the WBA bantamweight title from August 1988 to July 1989 and the WBC super-flyweight title between January 1990 and November 1993. His name is also rendered Sung Kil Moon.

Amateur career 
Moon, who compiled a purported record of 219–22 (164 KO) during his amateur career, was known as a great knockout puncher of the lighter divisions.  In 1982, he won the bantamweight gold medal at the Asian Games in New Delhi, knocking out Wanchai Pongsri of Thailand with one blow in the final.

In the 1984 Summer Olympics, Moon was eliminated in the quarterfinals by Pedro Nolasco via RSC in the first round due to a cut on his head after an accidental head butt.

In March 1985, Moon defeated future WBC Super Bantamweight champion Paul Banke by a third round referee stopped contest (RSC) at the USA-Korea Amateur Boxing Championships held in Las Vegas, Nevada.

In November 1985, Moon won the gold medal at the Boxing World Cup, manhandling all the opponents by KO.

In 1986, Moon became the first South Korean amateur boxer to win a gold medal at the World Amateur Boxing Championships, beating future Olympic silver medalists Aleksandar Hristov and Arnaldo Mesa in the tourney.

Results

Professional career
Moon's pro debut took place on March 8, 1987 with a first-round KO over Ric Bajelot, a fighter with 16 professional fights at the time. Moon won his first six fights by knock-out, before challenging Khaokor Galaxy for the WBA bantamweight title on August 14, 1988. Moon won a six-round technical decision to win the title. The fight was stopped early due to an accidental headbutt that cut Moon.

Moon would go on to make two successful defenses of his title, scoring a seventh-round KO of Edgar Omar Monserrat, and a fifth-round KO of Chiaki Kobayashi. Kobayashi, a former Japanese National Bantamweight Champion, retired after this defeat.

On July 9, 1989 Moon and Galaxy met in a rematch, this time Galaxy won a unanimous decision over 12 rounds to regain his WBA bantamweight title. Moon was knocked down twice in the 11th round, losing by scores of 120–109, 120–109 and 120–112.

Moon then moved down in weight. Moon scored a second-round KO over Romeo Opriasa in a tune-up bout, before challenging Nana Konadu on January 20, 1990 for the WBC and Lineal super-flyweight title. The fight between Moon and Konadu was a war, both fighters were knocked down several times. Moon won a ninth-round technical decision to capture the title, after once again becoming the victim of an accidental headbutt. Moon won by scores of 86–84, 86–82, and 87–84 to capture his second world title in his second division.

Moon would go on to record nine successful title defenses, including five victories over prior or future world champions. These victories included a ninth-round KO over former two-time WBC and Lineal super-flyweight Champion Gilberto Roman, a fourth-round KO over Konadu in their rematch, and a first-round KO over former two-time WBC light-flyweight and former WBA flyweight champion Hilario Zapata.

On July 3, 1993, Moon made his ninth and final successful title defense, scoring a 12-round majority decision over future IBF super-flyweight and WBO flyweight champion Carlos Gabriel Salazar.

On November 13, 1993 Moon lost a split decision to Jose Luis Bueno by scores of 115–114, 112–117 and 110–118 to lose the WBC super-flyweight Title. Sung-Kil Moon retired after this fight, finishing with professional record of 20 wins and two losses (15 by knockout).

Folk musician Mark Kozelek's current project, Sun Kil Moon, is named after Sung-Kil Moon.

Professional boxing record

See also
List of super-flyweight boxing champions
List of bantamweight boxing champions

References

External links

Moon Sung-kil - CBZ Profile

1963 births
Living people
Bantamweight boxers
Super-flyweight boxers
Boxers at the 1984 Summer Olympics
Olympic boxers of South Korea
Sportspeople from Seoul
World Boxing Association champions
World Boxing Council champions
World bantamweight boxing champions
World super-flyweight boxing champions
Asian Games medalists in boxing
Boxers at the 1986 Asian Games
Boxers at the 1982 Asian Games
South Korean male boxers
AIBA World Boxing Championships medalists
Asian Games gold medalists for South Korea
Medalists at the 1982 Asian Games
Medalists at the 1986 Asian Games